State Route 158 (SR 158), also known as Deer Creek Road, is a state highway in Clark County, Nevada.  The route connects Kyle Canyon Road to Lee Canyon Road in the Spring Mountains, in the  Humboldt-Toiyabe National Forest.

State Route 158 is a designated a Nevada Scenic Byway.

Route description

The route begins at an intersection with Kyle Canyon Road (SR 157) east of Mount Charleston. Heading north as the Deer Creek Road, SR 158 parallels the Humboldt-Toiyabe National Forest boundary before entering the forest. The highway ends at a junction with Lee Canyon Road (SR 156).

History

The Nevada Department of Transportation designated State Route 156 as a Nevada Scenic Byway in July 1998. The "Deer Creek Road" scenic route encompasses the entire  highway.

Major intersections

See also

References

158
Spring Mountains
158
Transportation in Clark County, Nevada